Jordan–Palestine relations are the strong, historical, but sometimes unstable, bilateral relations between the Hashemite Kingdom of Jordan and the State of Palestine.

Jordan has an office in Ramallah, while Palestine has an embassy in Amman. They are both members of the Arab League, OIC, and Union for the Mediterranean.

The flag of Jordan and Palestine are similar except Jordan has a white seven pointed star in middle of the red triangle.

History

1949–1967 
Jordan annexed the West Bank on 24 April 1950, after the 1949 armistice agreements. In 1951, King Abdullah I was assassinated by a Palestinian from the al-Husayni family. After the annexation, all Palestinians in the West Bank became Jordanian citizens. In the Jordanian parliament, there were 30 seats for both the West and East banks, making roughly equal populations. Palestinians in the West Bank did not face discrimination and were given the same equal rights as the Jordanians of the East Bank.

1967–1988 
After the Six-Day War, Jordan lost control of the West Bank to Israel. However, the Palestinians in the West Bank lost neither their citizenship nor their seats in the Jordanian parliament. About 300,000 Palestinians fled to Jordan. In 1970, a conflict broke out between the Jordanian Armed Forces led by King Hussein and the Palestine Liberation Organization led by Yasser Arafat. This conflict was known as Black September. After the war, Jordan expelled the PLO. Palestinians in the West Bank would retain their Jordanian citizenship until Jordan renounced all claims to the West Bank on 31 July 1988. Jordan later recognized the PLO as "the sole legitimate representative of the Palestinian people."

1988-1994 
Following the severance of legal ties between the West Bank and the Kingdom of Jordan in 1988, the Jordanian government supported PLO struggle to establish a Palestinian state over the West Bank and the Gaza Strip. During the peace conferences that followed the Madrid Peace Conference in 1991, the Palestinians were represented as a sub-delegation within the Jordanian-Palestinian delegation, this resulting from Israeli demands to refrain from representing the Palestinians as an independent nation. During the Israeli-Jordanian talks in Washington D.C. in 1992, most Israeli-Jordanian contentious issues were settled, but the Jordanian government refused to sign any official agreement with Israel as long as no agreement was reached with the Palestinians. 
On September 13, 1993 the Oslo agreement was signed, and the following day the Palestinian members of the Jordanian-Palestinian delegation became a separate delegation. The Oslo accord enabled the Jordanian delegation to openly negotiate with the Israeli delegation, and on October 26, 1994, the Israeli-Jordanian Peace Treaty was signed.

1994-present 
The Israeli-Jordanian peace treaty created some divisions between Jordan and the Palestinian Authority over the issue of the Islamic holy places in East Jerusalem, over which the treaty recognized Jordanian guardianship, while the Palestinian Authority claimed to have the same rights. On many other issues, the Jordanian government and the Palestinian Authority are in concert, as the government in Amman supports Palestinian aspirations for a state within 1967 boundaries. 

According to a public opinion poll conducted by the Centre for Strategic Studies (CSS) at the University of Jordan, 87% of the surveyed population at the grassroots level and 92% of the experts called Palestinian cause a top regional issue.

See also 
 Greater Palestine
 Foreign relations of Palestine
 Foreign relations of Jordan

References 

 
Palestine
Bilateral relations of the State of Palestine